Eusynthemis aurolineata is a species of dragonfly of the family Synthemistidae,
known as the variable tigertail. 
It is a medium-sized dragonfly with black and yellow markings.
It inhabits mountain swamps and streams in eastern Australia

Eusynthemis aurolineata appears similar to Eusynthemis guttata which is found in alpine streams.

Gallery

See also
 List of Odonata species of Australia

References

Synthemistidae
Odonata of Australia
Endemic fauna of Australia
Taxa named by Robert John Tillyard
Insects described in 1913